Mercer Mall is a shopping mall serving Bluefield, West Virginia. Opened in 1980, the mall features J. C. Penney, Belk, Roses, Rural King, and Hobby Lobby, plus 70 other stores. It is managed by Ershig Properties.

History
When it first opened in 1980, Mercer Mall had Sears, J. C. Penney, Montgomery Ward, Stone & Thomas, and Leggett (now Belk). The Montgomery Ward closed in 1987, and the space became a Hills, which was sold to Ames in 1999.  Stone & Thomas was sold to Elder-Beerman in 1998, but Elder-Beerman opted not to continue with the Bluefield store. Instead, Belk purchased the store and took the space for men's wear and home goods.

After Ames closed in 2000, the space became Carolina Pottery, which closed in 2006 and became Steve & Barry's. The space then became Roses in 2009 following the closure of Steve & Barry's. Belk later closed the second store, which became a Hobby Lobby in 2014. Also in 2014, Sears announced the closing of the Mercer Mall store. Rural King opened in the former Sears space at the mall on February 18, 2017.

References

External links
Official website

Shopping malls in West Virginia
Shopping malls established in 1980
1980 establishments in West Virginia
Tourist attractions in Mercer County, West Virginia
Buildings and structures in Bluefield, West Virginia